Arecibo is the debut extended play (EP) by English singer and songwriter Little Boots. It was released in the United States on 18 November 2008 by Iamsound Records.

Track listing

Notes
  signifies a remixer
  signifies an additional producer

Release history

References

2008 debut EPs
Albums produced by Greg Kurstin
Iamsound Records albums
Little Boots albums